The following article presents a summary of the 1911 football (soccer) season in Paraguay.

First Division
The Paraguayan first division championship was played for the "Copa El Diario", a trophy issued by the newspaper of the same name. Six teams participated in the tournament which was played in a two-round all-play-all system, being the team with the most points at the end of the two rounds the champion. Club nacional won its second championship after playing 9 games (one less than the other teams); with 6 wins, 3 draws and no losses.

References
 Paraguay - League History 1906-1964 by Karel Stokkermans at RSSSF
 Historia de la APF

External links
 APF Website

Paraguayan Primera División seasons
Para
1